The Queen's Gambit is a 2020 American coming-of-age period drama streaming television miniseries based on the 1983 novel of the same name by Walter Tevis. The title refers to the "Queen's Gambit", a chess opening. The series was written and directed by Scott Frank, who created it with Allan Scott, who owns the rights to the book. Beginning in the mid-1950s and proceeding into the 1960s, the story follows the life of Beth Harmon (Anya Taylor-Joy), a fictional chess prodigy on her rise to the top of the chess world while struggling with drug and alcohol dependency.

Netflix released The Queen's Gambit on October 23, 2020. After four weeks it had become Netflix's most-watched scripted miniseries, making it Netflix's top program in 63 countries. The series received critical acclaim, with particular praise for Taylor-Joy's performance, the cinematography, and production values. It also received a positive response from the chess community for its accurate depictions of high-level chess, and data suggests that it increased public interest in the game.

The Queen's Gambit won eleven Primetime Emmy Awards, including Outstanding Limited or Anthology Series, becoming the first show on a streaming service to win the category. The series also won two Golden Globe Awards: Best Limited Series or Television Film and Best Actress – Miniseries or Television Film for Taylor-Joy. She also won the Screen Actors Guild Award for Outstanding Performance by a Female Actor in a Miniseries or Television Movie.

Overview
The Queen's Gambit follows the life of an orphan chess prodigy, Elizabeth Harmon, during her quest to become an elite chess player while struggling with emotional problems, drugs and alcohol dependency. The title of the series refers to a chess opening of the same name. The story is set in the mid-1950s and 1960s.

In the 1950s in Lexington, Kentucky, an eight-year-old Beth, having lost her mother in a car crash, is taken to an orphanage where she is taught chess by the building's custodian, Mr. Shaibel. As was common at the time, the orphanage dispenses daily tranquilizer pills to the girls to "balance their disposition", which turns into an addiction for Beth. She quickly becomes a strong chess player due to her visualization skills. A few years later, Beth is adopted by childless suburban couple Alma and Allston Wheatley. As she adjusts to her new home, Beth enters a chess tournament and wins despite having no prior experience in competitive chess. Alma is initially resistant to Beth's interest in chess, but after Beth wins her first tournament, Alma is fully supportive of her adoptive daughter's sojourns to enter various chess competitions. She develops friendships with several people, including former Kentucky State Champion Harry Beltik, United States National Champion Benny Watts, and journalist and fellow player D.L. Townes.

As Beth rises to the top of the chess world and reaps the financial benefits of her success, her drug and alcohol dependency worsens. With help from her oldest friend Jolene, whom she grew up with in the orphanage, she prepares for her biggest challenge yet, a major international chess tournament against the world's best players in Moscow.

Cast and characters

Main
 Anya Taylor-Joy as Beth Harmon, an orphan who matures into a competitive young adult fueled by a desire to become the greatest chess player in the world while masking a growing addiction to the drugs and alcohol that allow her to function.
 Isla Johnston as nine-year-old Beth
 Annabeth Kelly as five-year-old Beth
 Bill Camp as Mr. William Shaibel, the custodian at the Methuen Home for Girls and an experienced chess player who teaches Beth how to play the game.
 Moses Ingram as Jolene, a rebellious teenager at the Methuen Home who becomes Beth's closest childhood friend.
 Christiane Seidel as Helen Deardorff, director of Methuen Home for Girls.
 Rebecca Root as Miss Lonsdale, the chaplain and choir director at Methuen.
 Chloe Pirrie as Alice Harmon, Beth's deceased mother (seen only in flashbacks) who earned a Ph.D. in mathematics at Cornell University before experiencing a downward spiral in her mental health.
 Akemnji Ndifornyen as Mr. Fergusson, the orderly at Methuen, who among other roles administers state-mandated pills to the girls.
 Marielle Heller as Alma Wheatley, who with her husband Allston adopts Beth as a young teenager and later acts as a manager for Beth's chess career. Alma's biological child died sometime before Beth's adoption, and she develops a worsening alcoholism that begins to influence Beth.
 Harry Melling as Harry Beltik, Kentucky State Champion, whom Beth defeats in her first tournament and later befriends.
 Patrick Kennedy as Allston Wheatley, Alma's husband and Beth's estranged adoptive father.
 Jacob Fortune-Lloyd as D.L. Townes, a chess player and journalist who befriends Beth and with whom she is infatuated.
 Thomas Brodie-Sangster as Benny Watts, a brash young New Yorker who is the reigning United States Chess Champion, later Beth's mentor, lover and friend.
 Marcin Dorociński as Vasily Borgov, Soviet World Champion and Beth's biggest challenge.

Recurring

 Sergio Di Zio as Beth's father.
 Dolores Carbonari as Margaret, Beth's high school classmate and bully.
 Eloise Webb as Annette Packer, a friendly teenager who becomes Beth's first tournament opponent.
 Matthew and Russell Dennis Lewis as Matt and Mike, twin brothers who serve as event organisers and tournament  directors at Beth's first tournament and go on to become her friends.
 Max Krause as Arthur Levertov, a grandmaster and friend of Benny's who assists Beth with her training.
 Ryan Wichert as Hilton Wexler, a strong player and chess problem enthusiast, friend of Benny.

Guest starring
 Jonjo O'Neill as Mr. Ganz, a local high school chess club teacher who invites a young Beth to play at his school.
 Louis Ashbourne Serkis as Georgi Girev, a 13-year-old Soviet chess prodigy.
 Janina Elkin as Borgov's wife, who is also his interpreter.
 Millie Brady as Cleo, a French model who had a brief affair with Benny. She quickly befriends Beth. 
 Bruce Pandolfini as Ed Spencer, a tournament director.
 John Schwab as Mr. Booth, Beth's minder from the State Department.
 Marcus Loges as Luchenko, a veteran former world chess champion and still a formidable player.

Episodes

Production

Development

On March 19, 2019, Netflix gave the production a series order consisting of six episodes. The series was written and directed by Scott Frank, who also created the series with Allan Scott. The two also served as executive producers alongside William Horberg. Allan Scott had been involved in attempts to get the book on screen since 1992, when he purchased the screenplay rights from Walter Tevis's widow.

The series was released on October 23, 2020, with seven episodes instead of the original six-episode order.

Writing
Former World Chess Champion Garry Kasparov and chess coach Bruce Pandolfini acted as consultants. Pandolfini had consulted with Tevis prior to the novel's publication some 38 years earlier, coming up with the title "The Queen's Gambit".

Pandolfini, together with consultants John Paul Atkinson and Iepe Rubingh, devised several hundred chess positions to be used for various situations in the script. Kasparov developed critical moments in the story, such as when a real 1998 game between grandmasters Arshak Petrosian and Vladimir Akopian was improved to showcase Beth's skill, or a 1993 game between Vasyl Ivanchuk and Patrick Wolff became the prototype for the decisive game in the last episode.

Casting
Alongside the series order announcement, it was announced that Anya Taylor-Joy was set to star as the lead. In January 2020, it was reported Moses Ingram had joined the cast of the series. Upon the miniseries premiere date announcement, it was announced that Bill Camp, Thomas Brodie-Sangster, Harry Melling and Marielle Heller were cast in starring roles. Because the majority of the filming was carried out in Berlin, the minor roles were filled mostly by British and German actors.

Production design and filming

Production designer Uli Hanisch developed the series' sets to evoke the aesthetic of the 1950s and 1960s. Much of the series was filmed in Berlin because interiors found there could stand in for a large number of the show's locations, including Las Vegas, Cincinnati, Mexico City, Moscow, and Paris.

Locations used in and near Berlin included the Kino International (for a restaurant, actually the Panorama Bar), the Berlin Zoo (for the zoo scene in Mexico City), the  vintage clothes store Humana (for Ben Snyder’s Department in Louisville, Kentucky), Schloss Schulzendorf (for the Methuen Home orphanage), the Rathaus Spandau (for a hotel lobby in Cincinnati), the Meistersaal in Kreuzberg (for the Cincinnati tournament), Palais am Funkturm (for the Hotel Mariposa in Las Vegas), the Protestant University of Applied Sciences in Zehlendorf (for the US Championship games location), Haus Cumberland and its Café Grosz (for the Paris tournament), the Bode Museum (for scenes that take place in Paris), Karl-Marx-Allee (exterior of a hotel said to be in Moscow); the final scene of Beth walking in Moscow was filmed at Rosengarten Square, also on Karl-Marx-Allee. The Bärensaal (aka Bear hall) in the Altes Stadthaus was used for scenes set at the Moscow Tournament. The Friedrichstadt-Palast stood in for the Aztec Palace Hotel. The exterior of Henry Clay High School in Lexington was actually filmed at Max Taut Schule.

Some scenes were filmed in Canada; principal photography began in August 2019 in Cambridge, Ontario. For example, the Harmon family home is a house on Brant Road in the city. Other houses where some filming was done are on Salisbury Ave. in Cambridge and on Blenheim Road; the latter is a mansion built in the 19th century. The exterior of St. Andrew's College, Aurora (Ontario) was used for the Ohio Championship facility but the interior was actually a Berlin facility. The exterior of the fictional Ben Snyder Department store in Kentucky was filmed at the Winners department store (Front Street and Berczy Park) in Toronto, Ontario, the rural bridge is the Meadowvale Road Bridge in Toronto and the Fairfield High School in the show is actually Western Technical-Commercial School in Toronto. The fictional Bradley's pharmacy was actually an outdoor set built at Walnut and King streets in Hamilton, Ontario.

Music

The musical score was composed by Carlos Rafael Rivera. Frank initially wanted the score to be piano-based only, but in the end decided with Rivera for a full orchestral score for more "instrumental depth and color". Rivera also described how he learned of the executive producer William Horberg's love of flute, and added prominent flute sections to the orchestral pieces. Rivera found scoring for chess a challenging task, having been warned by Frank that "music would be doing a lot of heavy lifting". He decided to reflect Beth's growth – both as a person and a chess player – by adding more and more instrumentation over time.

Reception

Audience viewership
In October 2020, the series was the most watched show on Netflix in the United States. On November 23, 2020, Netflix announced that the series had been watched by 62 million households since its release, becoming "Netflix's biggest scripted limited series to date." Of this, Scott Frank stated "I am both delighted and dazed by the response" while several outlets characterized it as an "unlikely success". The series topped the Nielsen's U.S. streaming rankings for the weeks of October 26 to November 1, November 2 to 8, and November 9 to 15, 2020, making it the first series to do so for three weeks straight.

The Queen's Gambit eventually ranked third in Reelgood's yearly ranking of Netflix shows during 2020, with Cocomelon taking the first spot.

Critical response

On review aggregator Rotten Tomatoes, The Queen's Gambit received an approval rating of 96% based on 105 reviews, with an average rating of 7.9/10. The website's critics consensus reads, "Its moves aren't always perfect, but between Anya Taylor-Joy's magnetic performance, incredibly realized period details, and emotionally intelligent writing, The Queen's Gambit is an absolute win." Metacritic gave the series a weighted average score of 79 out of 100 based on 28 reviews, indicating "generally favorable reviews".

In a column where she argues "So many lives would be different if we'd had The Queen's Gambit 50 years ago," culture critic Mary McNamara said, "I loved The Queen's Gambit so much, I watched the final episode three times." Sara Miller of The New Yorker recounted having experienced a sense of loss in her own association with the novel after seeing its depiction on screen because she could not relate to the main character: "Anya Taylor-Joy is way too good-looking to play Beth Harmon", she notes. Miller argues that Beth's ugliness is a central tension in the novel which the on-screen depiction misses completely despite staying true to everything else in the novel. Darren Franich of Entertainment Weekly gave the series a B and described the lead actress, "Taylor-Joy excels in the quiet moments, her eyelids narrowing as she decimates an opponent, her whole body physicalizing angry desperation when the game turns against her." Variety Caroline Framke wrote "The Queen's Gambit manages to personalize the game and its players thanks to clever storytelling and, in Anya Taylor-Joy, a lead actor so magnetic that when she stares down the camera lens, her flinty glare threatens to cut right through it." Reviewing for Rolling Stone, Alan Sepinwall gave it 3 out of 5 stars and said, "An aesthetically beautiful project with several superb performances, all in service to a story that starts to feel padded long before the end comes."

Critics also frequently discussed the series' prominent theme of substance abuse. Phoebe Wong notes that "Interestingly though, unlike other works which study the self-destructive aspects of perfectionist obsession, mental health and substance abuse issues extend beyond the protagonist to other characters" in her review for The Tufts Daily. Her summary reads "Impressive in its own right, The Queen's Gambit adopts a fresh perspective by delving into chess' intersections with substance abuse and gender discrimination". Matt Miller of Esquire stated "The result is a pretty scary depiction of the stress of competitive chess in the 1960s." On the other hand, Harper's Bazaars Lilly Dancyger considered the "misrepresentation" of drug abuse to "nearly ruin the show" for her, using the following Stephen King quote to explain: "The idea that the creative endeavor and mind-altering substances are entwined is one of the great pop-intellectual myths of our time."

The Washington Posts Monica Hesse considers the miniseries "revisionist history" but also "a wonderful future" in that the heroine's "uncluttered path to success" is "uninterrupted by sexism", and has men "refreshingly" looking out for the main female character, noting that the show "has no women in peril, and no skeezy men". Carina Chocano of The New York Times Magazine also believes that the show again and again foils the audience's expectations: the janitor does not molest her, her adoptive father leaves her alone, and her adoptive mother Alma does not hold her back, a departure Chocano attributes to the "fantasy"-like quality of The Queen's Gambit. Responding to these reviews, Fred Mazelis of the World Socialist Web Site wrote that "the claims that the series is appreciated because it is fantasy are disingenuous, to say the least. The show has struck a chord precisely because it is not seen as utopian fiction."
Bethonie Butler, also of The Washington Post, while praising the show overall, criticized the characterization of Jolene, the show's only major Black character, saying "(her) backstory and character development are so limited that she seems to exist merely to make Beth's life easier".

Many aspects of the series' production values have been praised and discussed, including its location choices, set design, and costumes.

Accolades

Chess community response
The series received praise from the chess community for its realistic portrayal of the game and players. In an interview with Vanity Fair, Woman Grandmaster Jennifer Shahade said that the series "completely nailed the chess accuracy". In an article about the miniseries in The Times, British chess champion David Howell felt that the chess scenes were "well choreographed and realistic", while British Women's chess champion Jovanka Houska said, "I think it's a fantastic TV series ... [i]t conveys the emotion of chess really well." Houska stated that she related to Beth being one of the few women in a tournament, and noted that sexism was worse at the "hobby" level, especially for young girls. International Master Dorsa Derakhshani described the show as "very, very accurate" and that she was surprised at "how actually strong the games are".

Judit Polgár, who was the first woman to play for a world championship title, said that the show depicted the male players as "too nice", while chess streamer Andrea Botez also felt the show "toned down" the sexism in the chess world. Former British women's champion Sarah Longson said that realistically, Beth should have lost more. Reigning chess world champion Magnus Carlsen gave it 5 out of 6 stars but found it "a little too unrealistic" for how quickly Beth developed her skills.

Lawsuit 
In the final episode of the mini-series, the women's world champion Nona Gaprindashvili is mentioned as having "never faced men", despite the real-life Gaprindashvili frequently playing against male opponents, including top-level grandmasters. In response, Gaprindashvili said it is dishonouring to have misinformation spread about someone's achievements. She sued Netflix for $5 million in a defamation lawsuit in September 2021, and called for the line that claimed she had never faced men to be removed. The case was settled in September 2022, on undisclosed terms.

Interest in chess
In November 2020, The Washington Post reported that the COVID-19 pandemic had already increased the public's interest in chess, but the popularity of The Queen's Gambit made it explode. The New York Times compared the interest in chess to the "similar chess mania" after Bobby Fischer beat Boris Spassky to become world champion in 1972. According to The Guardian, grandmaster Maurice Ashley has been inundated by messages from people – mainly women – enthused by the series: "the frenzy around it is crazy". Sales of chess sets rose greatly following the release of the series, with U.S. company Goliath Games stating their chess set sales increased over a thousand percent due to the series, while marketing firm NPD Group found chess book sales had increased over 600 percent. Chess.com reports several million new users since the release of the series, with a higher rate of registrations by female players compared to before the series. Chess instructors have stated that the demand for chess lessons has significantly increased as well.

Adaptations
In early 2021, due to the success of the series, the theatrical rights to the Tevis novel were acquired with the intent of producing a musical.

Legacy
Together with The Crown, another Netflix production, costumes from The Queen's Gambit were put on display by the Brooklyn Museum as part of its virtual exhibition "The Queen and the Crown".

Notes

References

External links
 
 

2020 American television series debuts
2020 American television series endings
2020s American drama television miniseries
2020 in chess
Alcohol abuse in television
Coming-of-age television shows
English-language Netflix original programming
Television series about orphans
Television shows about chess
Television shows about drugs
Television shows based on American novels
Television series created by Scott Frank
Television shows filmed in Germany
Television shows filmed in Ontario
Television shows set in Kentucky
Television shows set in Mexico City
Television shows set in Moscow
Television shows set in Paris
Television series set in the 1950s
Television series set in the 1960s
Best Miniseries or Television Movie Golden Globe winners
Primetime Emmy Award for Outstanding Miniseries winners